The 1939 Marquette Golden Avalanche football team was an American football team that represented Marquette University as an independent during the 1939 college football season. In its third season under head coach Paddy Driscoll, the team compiled a 4–4 record and outscored opponents by a total of 99 to 95. The team played its home games at Marquette Stadium in Milwaukee.

Schedule

References

Marquette
Marquette Golden Avalanche football seasons
Marquette Golden Avalanche football